Nikolett Szabó (born 11 May 1979) is a Hungarian Paralympic judoka.

References

1979 births
Living people
Sportspeople from Budapest
Hungarian female judoka
Judoka at the 2008 Summer Paralympics
Judoka at the 2012 Summer Paralympics
Judoka at the 2016 Summer Paralympics
Medalists at the 2012 Summer Paralympics
Paralympic medalists in judo
Paralympic bronze medalists for Hungary
Paralympic judoka of Hungary
20th-century Hungarian women
21st-century Hungarian women